Stewart McPherson may refer to:

 Stewart McPherson (VC) (1822–1892), Scottish soldier in India and recipient of the Victoria Cross
 Stewart McPherson (geographer) (born 1983), British geographer

See also
Stewart Macpherson (1865–1941), British musician and composer
Stewart MacPherson (broadcaster) (1908–1995), Canadian broadcaster